Elevenpoint is an unincorporated community in Randolph County, Arkansas.

History
A post office called Elevenpoint was established in 1915, and remained in operation until 1949. The community was named after the Eleven Point River.

References

Unincorporated communities in Randolph County, Arkansas
Unincorporated communities in Arkansas